Temu may refer to:
 Temu, the evening form of Ra, an ancient Egyptian god
 Temu, a Chagga clan name in Tanzania
 Temu (plant), an Indonesian common name for several plants in the family Zingiberaceae
 Temu, an alternative name for the Chilean myrtle tree, Luma apiculata
 Temù, a comune in the province of Brescia
 Temu, an underground oven used in Tonga
 Temu, a word in the Urhobo language meaning a substance or person reaching a position or status
 Naftali Temu, a Kenyan athlete
 Temu, rice cooked in woven coconut leaves from the Philippines
 Temu (company), an American e-commerce platform

See also
Teemu, given name